Floridiscrobs is a genus of very small aquatic snails, operculate gastropod mollusks in the family Pomatiopsidae.

Species
Species within the genus Floridiscrobs include:

Floridiscrobs dysbatus (Pilsbry & McGinty, 1949)

References

Pomatiopsidae
Monotypic gastropod genera